Adele Broadbent (born 17 April 1968) is a New Zealand children's author.

Biography 
Broadbent was born in Napier, New Zealand, on 17 April 1968.

Work 
Broadbent's early book publications include The Bike Race (2008), Ninjas! (2008), Not Exactly (2008), The Biggest Catch (2010) and The Winner Is (2010).

Too Many Secrets (2010) was nominated in the 2011 New Zealand Post Children's Book Awards. The story was one of Broadbent's first novels for children and young adults. One reviewer found the main character, Rebecca, too selfish to be likeable at first, but then became engrossed in the mysteries Rebecca encounters in her new home in the country.

Just Jack (2011) deals with the 1931 Hawke's Bay earthquake as part of the plot. The story borrows from Broadbent's own family stories, told by her grandfather. New Zealand Books calls Broadbent's writing in Just Jack "fresh, convincing and distinctive." It was named a Storylines Notable Book in 2012, and a 2012 New Zealand Children's Book Awards Junior Fiction finalist.

Trouble in Time was shortlisted for the LIANZA Esther Glen Junior Fiction Award, and was named a Storylines Notable Book in that year.

Books
Ninjas!, 2008, New Zealand, Wendy Pye Publishing 
The Bike Race, 2008, New Zealand, Wendy Pye Publishing 
The Biggest Catch, 2009, New Zealand, Wendy Pye Publishing 
The Winner Is, 2010, New Zealand, Wendy Pye Publishing 
Too Many Secrets, 2010, New Zealand, HarperCollins Publishers 
Just Jack, 2011, New Zealand, HarperCollins Publishers 
The Last Herrick Secret, 2012, New Zealand, AV Project 
Trouble in Time, 2014, New Zealand, Scholastic 
Between, 2018, New Zealand, OneTree House 
IF ONLY, 2020, New Zealand, OneTree House ISBN 9780995117532

Further reading
"The Incredibly Busy Adele Broadbent" in Magpies: Talking About Books For Children

External links
 Adele Broadbent on Facebook
 Adele Broadbent on Twitter

References

1968 births
Living people
21st-century New Zealand women writers
New Zealand women children's writers
21st-century New Zealand writers
New Zealand children's writers
People from Napier, New Zealand